The Mindoro short-legged skink (Brachymeles mindorensis) is a species of skink endemic to the Philippines.

References

Reptiles of the Philippines
Reptiles described in 1967
Brachymeles
Taxa named by Walter Creighton Brown
Taxa named by Dioscoro S. Rabor